Sanjay Singh (born 23 April 1994) is a professional squash player who represented Malaysia. He reached a career-high world ranking of World No. 115 in September 2015.

Personal life
Singh currently juggling between training and his studies for a business diploma at University Malaya.

References

External links 
 
 
 

Malaysian male squash players
Living people
1994 births
Punjabi people
Malaysian people of Indian descent
Malaysian people of Chinese descent
Malaysian people of Punjabi descent
People from Sarawak
Malaysian Sikhs
Southeast Asian Games medalists in squash
Southeast Asian Games gold medalists for Malaysia
Competitors at the 2015 Southeast Asian Games